Bali earthquake may refer to:

1815 Bali earthquake
1917 Bali earthquake
1976 Bali earthquake
1979 Bali earthquake
2004 Bali earthquake
2021 Bali earthquake